Israel national volleyball team may refer to:

 Israel men's national volleyball team
 Israel women's national volleyball team